Microwaves are electromagnetic waves with wavelengths ranging from as long as one meter to as short as one millimeter. 

Microwave or Microwaves may also refer to: 

 Microwave oven or simply "microwave", a kitchen appliance that cooks or heats food by dielectric heating
 Cosmic microwave background radiation (CMBR), a form of electromagnetic radiation that fills the universe
 Microwave chemistry, the science of applying microwave irradiation to chemical reactions
 Microwave landing system (MLS), an all-weather, precision aircraft landing system 
 Microwave spectroscopy, studies the absorption and emission of microwave electromagnetic radiation 
 Microwave transmission, the technology of transmitting information using microwaves by employing various electronic technologies
 Microwave (band), American band
 "The Microwave" or Vinnie Johnson (born 1956), American former basketball player

See also  
 Dielectric heating
 Electromagnetic radiation 
 Maser 
 Parabolic antenna 
 Radar 
 Waveguide